Coverack (meaning cove of the stream) is a coastal village and fishing port in Cornwall, England.

Coverack has several hotels and a youth hostel. The area is a centre for watersports, particularly wind surfing, sailing and diving. The nearby rocks known as the Manacles have been the site of many shipwrecks and as a consequence are now a favourite diving destination.

Geography
Near the South West Coast Path is Poldowrian Garden which includes a prehistoric settlement discovered in 1965, dated by archaeologists at 5500 BC. Finds from the site are available for viewing. The roads to Coverack cross Goonhilly Downs (famous for the BT satellite earth station).

"Coverack Cove and Dolor Point" SSSI (Site of Special Scientific Interest) is one of the most famous geological localities in Cornwall, providing an almost continuous section across a mantle-crust boundary. Other nearby SSSI are Coverack to Porthoustock and Kennack to Coverack.

Coverack lies within the Cornwall Area of Outstanding Natural Beauty (AONB).

History

St Peter's Church
St Peter's was consecrated on 20 August 1885 by the Bishop of Truro. The church overlooks the cove on land donated by Mr Trevennen and cost £500. Built in the Early English style, the footings are in local granite, the walls of red, Bridgewater brick, with the dressings of Breage granite. The village hall was built in 1885.

Coverack lifeboat
The Royal National Lifeboat Institution (RNLI) stationed a lifeboat at Coverack in 1901 following the wreck of the SS Mohegan on The Manacles in 1898 with the loss of more than 100 lives. A boat house with a slipway was built on the harbour. The all-weather lifeboat was withdrawn in May 1972 and replaced by a D-class inshore inflatable. The station was closed completely in October 1978 following the allocation of a faster boat to Falmouth Lifeboat Station.

A coxswain of the Coverack lifeboat, Archie Rowe, was a subject of This Is Your Life in 1958 when he was surprised by Eamonn Andrews at the BBC Television Theatre.

The following lifeboats were stationed at Coverack:

Christmas swim
Every year on Christmas Day, the villagers and holiday makers turn out to watch volunteers swim in the harbour in aid of charity. This tradition has gone on for nearly 50 years and has raised thousands of pounds for Cancer Research.

July 2017 flash flood
On 18 July 2017 the village was hit by a flash flood.  Roads were blocked and hailstones the size of 50 pence pieces (30 mm) smashed windows.  Heavy rainfall hit at about 15:00 BST. The coastguard was needed to airlift two people who were trapped on the roof of a house.

References

External links

 Coverack village web site

Villages in Cornwall
Populated coastal places in Cornwall
Ports and harbours of Cornwall
Sites of Special Scientific Interest in Cornwall
St Keverne